Rawdon Blandford (1891–1961) was a New Zealand born stage and screen actor.

Filmography
A Maori Maid's Love (1916)
The Breaking of the Drought (1920)
The Bushwhackers (1925)
Painted Daughters (1925)
Peter Vernon's Silence (1926)

Personal
Blandford was born in Dunedin, Otago, New Zealand to George and Annie Jane Blandford in 1891. He died in Perth, Western Australia in 1961.

References

External links

1891 births
1961 deaths
New Zealand male actors